The Preiching of the Swallow, is the eighth poem in the accepted text of Robert Henryson's Middle Scots cycle, The Morall Fabillis of Esope the Phrygian written around the 1480s. Often seen as the most beautiful of the poems in the cycle, it is a very rich expansion of material ultimately derived from Aesop. It is the second of two poems in the cycle which feature the narrator as protagonist in the taill.

Works by Robert Henryson
15th-century poems
Scottish poems